Erphaea pumicosa is a species of longhorn beetle of the subfamily Lamiinae. It was described by Wilhelm Ferdinand Erichson in 1847, and is known from Peru, Bolivia, and eastern Ecuador.

References

Beetles described in 1847
Beetles of South America
Acanthocinini